Larry Achiampong (born 1984) is a British Ghanaian artist whose work includes moving image; sculptural installation; photographic and painted collage; audio and visual archives; live performance; spoken word; recorded sound bytes and composed scores. Recurring themes within these works often explore postcolonial themes and the idea of a post-human existence.

He is known for his major public commissions for Somerset House and Transport for London.  Both works focus on Pan-African histories and futures with a thematic focus on the ideas of Pan Africanism in the form of flags and colour representation. He is currently represented by Copperfield Gallery, London.

Selected solo shows 
 2022 Wayfinder  (Turner Contemporary) 
 2020 When the Sky Falls (John Hansard Gallery, Southampton)
2016 Larry Achiampong: OPEN SEASON (Logan Center, University of Chicago, Chicago)

Public commissions 

 2022 Pan African Flag for the Relic Travellers’ Alliance (Union) – permanent rondel at Westminster Underground Station

 2019–2020 Art on The Underground: Westminster Station Commission – (Art on the Underground/Transport for London)
 2017 PAN AFRICAN FLAG FOR THE RELIC TRAVELLERS’ ALLIANCE (ASCENSION) – flag commission (Somerset House)

References

External links

1984 births
Living people
British contemporary artists
Black British artists
Alumni of the Slade School of Fine Art
21st-century British male artists